The 30 June 2011 Nimruz province bombing was a roadside bombing targeting a bus of civilians killing 20 and injuring more than 30 in Nimruz province, Afghanistan. The bus was traveling on a highway between Kandahar and Nimruz province frequently used by coalition forces when it was struck by a bomb. The Taliban did not claim responsibility for the bombing.

References

2011 murders in Afghanistan
Mass murder in 2011
Mass murder in Afghanistan
Improvised explosive device bombings in Afghanistan
Terrorist incidents in Afghanistan in 2011
History of Nimruz Province
June 2011 events in Afghanistan